Mauldslie Castle West Lodge is a 19th-century gatehouse in Dalserf, South Lanarkshire, Scotland. A Category A listed building, it was completed in 1861, believed to be the work of David Bryce.

The adjoining Mauldslie Bridge, a separate listing, was built for James Hogier, of Newlands, to serve Mauldslie Castle, built by Thomas, 5th Earl of Hyndford, in 1793. The castle was demolished in 1935. A seated-dog motif above the gate, which appears with an inscription of "Aye Ready", can also be found in the garden of the Marna gate lodge, to the south. That also is a listed structure.

Hogier's initials appear on the eastern elevation of the gatehouse.

See also
List of listed buildings in Dalserf, South Lanarkshire

References

Category A listed buildings in South Lanarkshire
Houses in South Lanarkshire
Gatehouses (architecture)
1861 establishments in Scotland